Anoplomerus buqueti is a species of beetle in the family Cerambycidae. It was described by Belon in 1890.

References

Hesperophanini
Beetles described in 1890